The Denti della Vecchia (1,491 m) (lit. "teeth of the old woman") are a mountain of the Lugano Prealps, located north of Lake Lugano on the border between Italy and Switzerland. They are composed of several summits of which the highest is named Sasso Grande.

References

External links
Denti della Vecchia on Hikr

Mountains of the Alps
Mountains of Lombardy
Mountains of Switzerland
Mountains of Ticino
One-thousanders of Switzerland